Delahunty is a surname. Notable people with the surname include:

 Catherine Delahunty (born 1953), New Zealand politician
 George Delahunty, physiologist and endocrinologist
 Hugh Delahunty (born 1949), Australian politician
 Jo Delahunty (born 1963), British barrister, judge, and legal academic
 Kieran Delahunty, Irish hurler
 Mary Delahunty (born 1951), Australian journalist and politician
 Mike Delahunty (born 1952), Australian rules footballer
 Robert Delahunty, American legal scholar
 Sarah Delahunty (born 1952), New Zealand writer
 Tom Delahunty (1935–2018), New Zealand association football referee

See also
 Tom De La Hunty (born 1956), British bobsledder
 Delahunty v Player and Wills (Ireland) Ltd., Irish court case